Forge is a superhero appearing in American comic books published by Marvel Comics, most commonly in association with the X-Men. A mutant with an unsurpassed brilliance in technology, he has had a lengthy career as a government weapons contractor. Created by writer Chris Claremont and artist John Romita Jr., Forge first appeared in The Uncanny X-Men #184 (Aug. 1984).

Forge shared a romantic relationship with Storm and a brief affair with Mystique, which led him to associate with the X-Men and thus enhancing the technology at the X-Mansion. He was also a member of X-Factor.

Publication history

Forge was created by writer Chris Claremont and artist John Romita Jr. His first appearance was in The Uncanny X-Men #184 (Aug. 1984).

Claremont's outline for the character's debut includes a real name of Forge, Daniel Lone Eagle, although the character was not named in Marvel canon.

As part of Marvel NOW!, Forge returns as a member of Cable's X-Force.

Fictional character biography

Early years
Forge is a mutant with an innate superhuman talent for invention and an intuitive genius. He is a Native American of the Cheyenne nation. Although he was trained as a medicine man, he has primarily relied upon technology rather than mysticism to accomplish his tasks. This rift between Forge and his elder teacher, Naze, made Forge leave his past behind and join the military.

While in the army, Forge served in the Vietnam War. After rising in the ranks to become a sergeant, he was asked to join S.H.I.E.L.D. Forge declined, because he saw his need was in Vietnam. During his second tour of duty in the war, his comrades were killed by enemy troops. In anger, he used their spirits to summon a band of demons to destroy the opposition. Forge, concerned about his former comrades, decided to order a B-52 bombing on his position to close the portal from the world of the unliving. The bombs destroyed the spirits, but he was injured as well, losing his right leg and right hand. This action allowed the demon called the Adversary to come to Earth, and Forge has since been hesitant to employ his mystical abilities.

Years later, Forge creates cybernetic replacements for his lost limbs. When Tony Stark stops making advanced weaponry for the US government, Forge is hired as an employee of the Defense Department.

One of his earliest commissions is to design a weapon to detect the shape-shifting aliens known as the Dire Wraiths. Subsequently, Forge constructs a device capable of neutralizing mutant powers. Following orders from the President, Henry Peter Gyrich, an agent of the National Security Council, takes the device. Forge protests because the device is untested and extremely dangerous to use. The device is used against Rogue, who was wanted for allegedly killing a S.H.I.E.L.D. agent. However, the device instead removes the powers of her teammate, Storm.

Romance
Forge rescues Storm after she falls into a river. Forge brings her back to his home in Dallas, Texas. During her recovery, romantic feelings develop between them. When she finds out he developed the device which removed her abilities, Storm leaves. They are briefly reunited to fight the common enemy of the Dire Wraiths, who are trying to prevent Forge from perfecting his neutralizer. They are defeated by the combined forces of the X-Men, Magik and Amanda Sefton.

Forge later improves his Neutralizer, but is hesitant to design more devices like it because of what happened with Storm. With the help of the Wraiths' enemy, Rom the Spaceknight, Forge creates a large scale version of the neutralizer in Earth's orbit. Rom and Forge use the device on the Wraith's home-world, casting the entire race into the other-dimensional Limbo.

After saving the world, Forge destroys all remaining Neutralizers and focuses on ridding the Earth of the Adversary. The Adversary, in the shape of Naze, convinces Storm that Forge was driven insane by her leaving and is planning to open a gate to hell. Storm tries to kill Forge, but the moment she stabs him she sees that she was tricked. During the events of the Fall of the Mutants crossover, the Adversary banishes Storm and Forge to another dimension, devoid of human life. Storm and Forge spend an unknown amount of time there, rekindling their romance. Forge is able to restore Storm's abilities and use them to power a gate back home.

X-Men
Forge and Storm arrive on Earth and join the X-Men in their battle with the Adversary. Forge is required to sacrifice nine willing lives to banish the Adversary forever; eight X-Men and Madelyne Pryor volunteer and die in the casting of Forge's spell. The goddess Roma intervenes and secretly restores the X-Men to life. Magik, younger sister of X-Man Colossus, sees Forge as responsible for the death of her brother and attacks Forge, who fights back using his knowledge of Native-American sorcery. Feeling guilty over his involvement, Forge allows Magik to stab him with her Soulsword in the hopes it will kill him. Instead, its effects cause both mutants to come to terms with their shortcomings.

Destiny
Forge, still unaware of the X-Men's resurrection, fights alongside Mystique's Freedom Force and an interim team of "X-Men" against the Reavers at Muir Island. He uses his mutant skills to create a rifle that deactivates the cyborg enemy Skullbuster and forces the rest of the Reavers to retreat. During the battle, Destiny is killed, but not before foreseeing that Forge and Mystique will one day love one another, a fact that both parties find implausible. Afterwards, Mystique blames him for Destiny's death.

Banshee approaches Forge, on a lead given by Lorna Dane (Polaris) that the team is still alive. Forge is convinced by visions that all the X-Men are still alive. During this time, his days as a soldier in the Vietnam War are depicted. The two of them plan to travel all over the world looking for their missing friends, starting with Storm in Cairo, Egypt, but their plane is ambushed by the Fenris Twins. Later, they go to the ruins of the Xavier Mansion (destroyed during the events of Inferno), and rescue Jean Grey from a gang of Masque's Morlocks. They finally learn that the X-Men are indeed alive, but have faked their deaths for the time being.

Forge and Banshee eventually find the X-Men and become full-time members. They fight against several threats, such as Genoshan soldiers, Skrulls, and the Shadow King. During X-Tinction Agenda, Forge's skills are critical in defeating Cameron Hodge and overthrowing the Genoshan government. His plans are kept deep inside his own mind by a self-induced trance that even the forced removal of his artificial limbs cannot break.

End of romance
After the events of the Muir Island Saga, Forge becomes a member of the X-Mansion's "support team". He redesigns the Danger Room and the Blackbird jet.

With the arrival of Bishop and Storm's constant involvement with the team, Forge and Storm's relationship becomes rocky. Forge leaves the X-Men after coming to believe Storm would have rejected his proposal of marriage. The pair continue to have an on-again-off-again relationship, until it ends for good. Forge goes back home to Dallas to become a government contractor again and to help with the mental care of Mystique, who is becoming schizophrenic. During her stay, Forge and Mystique grow closer and have an affair.

X-Factor
Forge replaces Valerie Cooper as the new government liaison for the mutant superhero team X-Factor. Forge goes on his second cosmic adventure while with X-Factor, venturing to the far side of the sun with dozens of other superheroes in the incident known as the Infinity Crusade. Forge is personally affected as one of his team, Wolfsbane, is kidnapped by the villain called the Goddess. Forge ends up orbiting a duplicate Earth in an escape pod, along with the vigilante Nomad.

When the team begins to experience personal problems, Forge takes a more active involvement, gradually taking over the leadership of the remaining members of X-Factor. In this role, he sees the mutant criminals Mystique and Sabretooth forced to become unwilling members of his team. Forge also comes to terms with his heritage when the Adversary returns. With Naze's assistance, Forge defeats the Adversary by combining technology created using his mutant powers with his mystical abilities. Under Forge's leadership, X-Factor is tricked into hunting and battling former team member Multiple Man. Following this, Forge severs the team's involvement with the government and leads them underground. Forge and Mystique become more attracted to one another while working together as members of the team, with Forge ultimately falling in love with Mystique. During their time underground, another former X-Factor member, Strong Guy, awakes from a coma that he suffered due to his powers over-stressing his heart. Forge creates a device that saves Strong Guy's life.  Along with the other team members, Forge is severely injured after Sabretooth betrays and attacks the team. Mystique escapes her forced membership while Forge is recuperating. After recovering from his injuries, Forge refuses to become a member of a new X-Factor line-up led by former team leader Havok, as he feels that Havok is no longer trustworthy. This new version of X-Factor disbands shortly thereafter. For a time, Forge is not active on any mutant groups, though he briefly works as support staff at the X-Men's mansion.

Xavier's Underground
Forge takes part in Xavier's Underground movement. He works with a former X-Factor member, Multiple Man, in Genosha. Afterwards, Forge returns to the X-Men and briefly becomes a mentor to Danielle Moonstar.

Later, Charles Xavier asks him for help in locating Mystique whom he needs for a clandestine mission. Forge also helps Cannonball and Siryn find Cable with the aid of Deadpool, and builds a pair of special gauntlets for New X-Men team member Surge; afterward, he returns to his lab to build a Nimrod unit with the primary objective of protecting mutants and secondary objective of protecting humans. He then encounters a time-traveling Nimrod suffering from severe damage, demanding that Forge fix him; this version of Nimrod comes from an alternate future, and had compelled an alternate version of Forge (married to Storm, with two children) to build a device to allow it to travel to the past. The alternate Forge had seemingly complied, but actually built a device to send Nimrod not only back in time, but also to another timeline, and to disable him upon arrival. Nimrod threatens to harm this reality's Storm, and Forge offers to transfer Nimrod into his own version of the Sentinel, which Nimrod agreed to.  The transfer is interrupted by the arrival of Surge and the rest of the New X-Men, who had received Forge's distress call through Surge's own gauntlets; in the ensuing battle, Forge helps them defeat Nimrod.

Messiah Complex
After Forge sends Madrox and Layla to the future, he goes on a mission at Cyclops' behest to rendezvous with the other X-Men, who are on their way to confront Sinister's forces. He is shot by a seemingly treacherous Bishop. He is seen later in the recovery room along with other injured X-Men.

Divided We Stand
Forge suffers an array of injuries, including serious head trauma, from Bishop's attack during his mad quest to murder the first mutant child following M-Day. Bishop steals several time travel devices that Forge is reverse engineering. Throughout his recovery, Forge is obsessed with recreating his notes and research on these devices. Fixated to an unhealthy degree on this project, Forge shuts himself off in his home at Eagle Plaza to devote all his time to this work. But before he begins, he enhances his home's defense systems to ensure that he never falls victim to such an attack again.

Ghost Box
Forge later returns in Astonishing X-Men #29, when the X-Men fly to his complex on Wundagore Mountain to confront him about his apparent role in an inter-dimensional invasion of Earth. After following a trail of mysteriously genetically created mutants and death, the X-Men track Forge down, who through a monologue, reveals his true madness. He wants to save the world from the Annexation, an invasion from a parallel world on the other side of the Ghost Box, the trans-dimensional teleporter. He plans to send the X-Men to the parallel universe that is home to the Ghost Boxes to destroy them before the Annexation begins. The X-Men try to talk Forge down, but he rebukes them and forcibly opens the Ghost Box, risking all life on Earth. Thanks to the assistance of Abigail Brand and Beast, a laser is shot into the opening of the Ghost Box.  Before everything is destroyed, Ororo offers Forge a chance to come back with them. A bitter Forge rejects her offer, and stays in his complex as it is destroyed.

Cable and X-Force
As part of Marvel NOW!, Forge is shown to still be alive following the destruction of his complex, and has apparently restored his original right hand (but still uses a prosthetic for his right leg). Forge is approached by Cable (after he used his telepathic abilities to help cure him of his insanity) to be in a new X-Force team created by Cable.

All-New, All-Different Marvel
As part of the All-New, All-Different Marvel, Forge appears as a member of Storm's X-Men as their primary technician even though his relationship with Storm is awkward and strained. Forge programmed Cerebra into the body of a Sentinel with the capability to showcase human emotion and the ability to teleport along with mutant detection so she could be a bridge between Earth and Limbo.

Dawn of X
Professor X tasks Forge with modifying Cerebro so it can store backups for mutant minds. Forge would later assist the Marauders with recovering his mutant power neutralizers after they were co-opted by the Russians.

In Destiny of X, Forge is selected to be part of the new X-Men team during the second Hellfire Gala.

Powers and abilities

Forge is a mutant with a superhuman intuitive talent for inventing mechanical devices, backed up by the ability to visually perceive mechanical energy in action. This power allows him to instinctively recognize the potential and functional uses of any machine or technological device in his visual range, a skill that combined with his natural intelligence gives him the ability to conceive, design and build highly advanced mechanical devices; and operate, modify and disassemble existing technology or create countermeasures for it. Forge's superhuman talent for invention does not mean that he is of a superhuman intellect, even a genius at invention must for the most part consciously work out the theoretical principles behind the invention and then the design of the invention itself through a series of logical steps. In Forge's case, however, many of these logical steps are worked out by his subconscious mind. Hence, Forge himself might not be entirely aware of exactly how he figured out how to create an invention of his. Sometimes, he must disassemble a device he has made to even figure out how it works.

Forge wore synthetic stretch fabric backed by micro-thin bulletproof Kevlar and thermal insulation while a member of the X-Men. He sometimes employs devices of his own invention.  Most notable among these was his Neutralizer gun that could suppress superhuman mutant abilities. The only known examples of this device have been destroyed. Forge has also invented a hand-held scanning device that can detect the presence of superhuman beings or aliens.

Forge has knowledge of many scientific and technological fields.

He also possesses various mystical abilities such as spell casting through mystical training, though he rarely uses them. He possesses extensive knowledge of Native American magic.

His bionic-robotic right hand (which he has since restored to its original organic state) and right leg often contain concealed weapons and devices that he can use in combat. In addition, they can be outfitted with computer interfaces and plasma blasters. His skill as a hand-to-hand combatant and as a marksman from his military training were so impressive that Nick Fury offered him a job with S.H.I.E.L.D.

Reception
 In 2014, Entertainment Weekly ranked Forge 38th in their "Let's rank every X-Man ever" list.
 In 2018, CBR.com ranked Forge 30th in their "Age Of Apocalypse: The 30 Strongest Characters In Marvel's Coolest Alternate World" list.
 In 2018, CBR.com ranked Forge 19th in their "20 Most Powerful Mutants From The '80s" list.

Other versions

Age of Apocalypse
In the Age of Apocalypse reality, Forge was a member of Magneto's rebels, the X-Men, and years of combat against Apocalypse's empire had left him a cyborg with a mostly-robotic body except for the right half of his face. He left them to go his own way and became the founder and leader of the Outcasts, an anti-Apocalypse resistance cell of mutants disguised as a traveling theater group. The Outcasts' consisted of Soaron, Toad, Brute, and Mastermind, and later Sonique and Essex, who is rescued by the group from the Infinites during their attack on a train. He became a father figure to Nate Grey, and also his trainer, teaching him how to combat without using his powers. When the Outcasts were attacked by Domino and her henchmen Caliban and Grizzly, Forge attempted to distract them with a Flash Grenade and later in the battle personally killed Grizzly for killing Toad. Forge was eventually killed by Sinister, who had been masquerading as a member of the Outcasts called Essex.

Here Comes Tomorrow
In the apocalyptic alternate future of Here Comes Tomorrow, the final arc of Grant Morrison's run of New X-Men, a British Mutant under the name Smith had taken Forge's alias, the Maker. Though his powers and his relation to Forge, if any, are unknown, he bore some physical resemblance to the former Maker, and also carried numerous mechanical tools.

House of M
Forge is seen in House of M as a scientist working under Tony Stark, Iron Man. He is one of Stark's most trusted employees and is one of the first to learn that he is truly Iron Man. He utilizes his skills in technology and computers by aiding Jarvis and Stark in tracking down the mutant gene bombs that Johnny Storm and Stark are hunting down all over the city.

Hulk: Future Imperfect
In the mini-series Hulk: Future Imperfect, describing an alternate timeline where the Hulk becomes the Maestro, the Maestro claims that Forge created a weapon specifically designed to kill the Maestro, but that the Maestro killed him before the weapon could be used. The present-day Hulk would later encounter Forge using such a weapon.

Marvel Zombies
Forge appears in Marvel Zombies alongside Magneto's Acolytes as one of few survivors who were hiding on Asteroid M from the hordes of zombie superheroes on Earth. He constructs artificial limbs for the Black Panther after the zombie Giant-Man consumes some of his original ones. Forge becomes close friends with Black Panther, and Forge's daughter later marries Black Panther's son, and the couple later conceives a child. After the Panther's and Forge's children die under mysterious circumstances (later revealed that to have been murdered by Malcolm Cortez), both friends become closer through their shared tragedy, and help to raise their grandson together.

During the former heroes' forty years of absence, Forge anticipates that the zombies would return. Over the decades he and his forces plunder the technological remnants of the world. He makes improvements to Reed Richards' and Tony Stark's technologies for defenses of the colony New Wakanda, such as the Avengers' force field projector and Iron Man's armors. The inter-dimensional transporter is the only technology Forge is unable to rebuild, and it is later revealed that Fabian Cortez's son, Malcolm, has sabotaged it by removing some of its key components. Forge dons one of the Iron Man armors when the zombies return. After multiple extensive battles, the surviving zombies and the colonists begin a truce because the returning zombies' hunger has faded. Cortez ambushes and teleports the zombies to another dimension to seize power within the colony.

Mutant X
The version of Forge who appears in the Mutant X comic is virtually the same as his mainstream incarnation: he first used his powers to manufacture anti-mutant technology for the government, and later becomes Storm's lover. However, because Storm has become a vampire in the Mutant X universe, he allows her to regularly drain blood from him so that she will not have to violate her oath to never take a life.

Ronin
In an alternate reality of X-Men: Ronin, the X-Men are superheroes based out of Japan. Forge is a Japanese police officer with an attraction to Storm. He also helps build and pilot an array of robots called Sentinel Force which are sent against the X-Men.

Ultimate Marvel
In the Ultimate Marvel continuity, Forge has been dramatically re-imagined. He became a member of the Brotherhood of Mutants and follows Magneto with the promise of getting to strike back at humans. This version of Forge is also now of Asian Indian descent, a play upon the mainstream version of the character's American Indian heritage.

Magneto ordered Forge to invent a machine that would enhance his abilities to a point where Magneto would be able to kill every human on Earth. Forge, slightly naive, agreed to build it, the promise of Magneto's offer of ownership of Canada and a hate-free world blinding him. It was only at the final stages of his machine that he realized what he was truly doing -— about to slaughter millions of people. He attempts to confront Magneto about this, telling him that he was under the impression that Magneto would only frighten the humans. Magneto replies that at the start of a new nation, one must make sacrifices and coldly asks Forge if he is hesitating. Forge hastily assures him no; he is later seen depressed and angry.

In the 'Magnetic North' storyline it is revealed that he was freed from prison by Mystique. As a pair, they frame Lorna Dane with one of Forge's devices. It causes her powers to malfunction, killing dozens of innocent people. Later, Forge does nothing as Mystique snaps the neck of a female police officer and assumes her form. As part of a carefully thought out plan, Forge and Mystique later personally attack the Triskelion; the headquarters for the Ultimates and a supervillain prison. They kill dozens of S.H.I.E.L.D. soldiers during the attack and even more die cleaning up the prison break which results.

He is then taken into custody, but escapes Triskelion using a phasing device, also helping Wolverine break out as well. Although, according to Nick Fury, he orchestrated the escape for Wolverine (Ultimate Marvel character) to lead him to the Hulk's location. He is later tortured and killed in the Savage Land.

Exiles
An alternate version of Forge, who appears to be a White American with no apparent Native heritage (but still a cyborg with a robotic right leg, though now also with a robotic right full-arm instead of just a robotic right hand), is drafted onto the interdimensional superhero group the Exiles. Originating from Earth-2814, he was married to his reality's Storm. In this reality, the Skrulls succeeded in conquering Earth, but Forge rebuilt and reprogrammed Sentinel City to destroy their command city. He seemingly perished in the explosion, but was instead plucked out of time and put on the Exiles.

Age of X
An alternate version of Forge is present in the Age of X reality. He was present when Magneto used New York City skyscrapers to create his so-called "Fortress X".

Old Man Logan
As revealed by Old Man Logan, the Earth-21923 Forge was not with the X-Men the night when the villains rose and Mysterio tricked Wolverine into killing his fellow X-Men. Many years later after the villains took over the United States of America and renamed it Amerika, Forge was shown living in a Cheyenne reservation in South Dakota when Rhino led the Rhino Gang into invading. While Forge's highly advanced weaponry defeated the Rhino Gang, Forge rode an exo-skeleton which he used to beat Rhino to death. Upon ending up on Earth-616, Old Man Logan told Forge about the fate of his Earth-807128 counterpart. Even though Old Man Logan never visited the Cheyenne Reservation, he was sure that Forge was the one responsible for protecting it from the Rhino Gang. A return to this Wasteland sees a renewed focus on Forge. He has built a fortress on his land, above and below. When it is attacked by Sabretooth clones, Forge sacrifices his life to detonate his secret weapon, an unstable Old Man Speedball.

In other media

Television
 Forge appears in X-Men: The Animated Series, voiced by Marc Strange. This version is the leader of X-Factor. Additionally, an alternate timeline version who serves as the leader of a mutant resistance also appears in the series.
 A teenage Forge appears in the X-Men: Evolution episode "Middleverse", voiced by Sam Vincent. This version possesses the additional ability to transform one of his hands into a multi-tooled robotic device and was trapped in a pocket dimension for three decades due to one of his inventions backfiring until he is rescued by Nightcrawler in the present.
 A young Forge appears in Wolverine and the X-Men, voiced by Roger Craig Smith. This version is an inexperienced member of the X-Men who serves as their engineer and mission analyst.

Video games
 Forge appears as a non-playable character (NPC) in X-Men II: The Fall of the Mutants.
 Forge appears in Storm's ending in X-Men: Children of the Atom.
 Forge appears in Storm's ending in X-Men vs. Street Fighter.
 Forge appears as a playable character in X-Men: Mutant Academy 2, voiced by Marc Strange.
 Forge appears as a playable character in X-Men: Next Dimension, voiced by Carlos Ferro.
 Forge appears as a NPC in X-Men Legends, voiced by Lou Diamond Phillips. 
 Forge appears as a NPC in X-Men Legends II: Rise of Apocalypse, voiced again by Lou Diamond Phillips.
 Forge appears as a NPC in X-Men: Destiny, voiced by Phil LaMarr.
 Forge makes a cameo appearance in Strider Hiryu's ending in Ultimate Marvel vs. Capcom 3.
 Forge appears in Marvel Heroes, voiced by Carlos Alazraqui.

References

External links
 UncannyXmen.net Spotlight on Forge
 Forge on the Marvel Universe Character Bio Wiki

Characters created by Chris Claremont
Characters created by John Romita Jr.
Comics characters introduced in 1984
Fictional amputees
Fictional Cheyenne people
Fictional inventors
Fictional mechanics
Fictional military sergeants
Fictional Native American people in comics
Fictional United States Army personnel
Fictional Vietnam War veterans
Marvel Comics characters who use magic
Marvel Comics cyborgs
Marvel Comics male superheroes
Marvel Comics martial artists
Marvel Comics military personnel
Marvel Comics mutants
X-Factor (comics)
X-Men members